Many Glaciers Pond is a pond,  long, located  south of the snout of Commonwealth Glacier in Taylor Valley, Victoria Land, Antarctica. The pond is part of the Aiken Creek system and receives drainage from several glaciers including Commonwealth Glacier, Wales Glacier and the unnamed glacier next westward. The name was suggested by United States Geological Survey (USGS) hydrologist Diane McKnight, leader of USGS field teams that studied the hydrology of streams entering Lake Fryxell, Taylor Valley, over the period 1987–94.

References

Lakes of Victoria Land
McMurdo Dry Valleys